"The Blues" is the title of a number-one R&B single by the band Tony! Toni! Toné!. The hit song spent one week at number one on the U.S. R&B singles chart and peaked at number 46 on the Billboard Hot 100. The single also peaked at number 43 on the Hot Dance Club Play Chart, and number 92 on the UK Singles Chart

See also
 List of number-one R&B singles of 1990 (U.S.)

References

External links
[ Song review] on AllMusic

1990 songs
1990 singles
Tony! Toni! Toné! songs
Wing Records singles
Songs written by D'wayne Wiggins